The Miner is a 2017 Slovenian drama film directed by Hanna Antonina Wojcik Slak. It was selected as the Slovenian entry for the Best Foreign Language Film at the 90th Academy Awards, but it was not nominated. This film follows the true story of a miner, who discovers thousands of executed people in Barbara Pit massacre.

Plot
Alija discovers thousands of bodies of people executed during World War II in an abandoned mine. His employer, wanting to sell the mine, pressures him to keep quiet, but he risks his job by alerting police.

Cast
 Boris Cavazza
 Jure Henigman
 Leon Lučev
 Tin Marn
 Marina Redzepovic

See also
 List of submissions to the 90th Academy Awards for Best Foreign Language Film
 List of Slovenian submissions for the Academy Award for Best Foreign Language Film

References

External links
 

2017 films
2017 drama films
Slovene-language films
Slovenian drama films